In finance, delta neutral describes a portfolio of related financial securities, in which the portfolio value remains unchanged when small changes occur in the value of the underlying security. Such a portfolio typically contains options and their corresponding underlying securities such that positive and negative delta components offset, resulting in the portfolio's value being relatively insensitive to changes in the value of the underlying security.

A related term, delta hedging is the process of setting or keeping the delta of a portfolio as close to zero as possible.  In practice, maintaining a zero delta is very complex because there are risks associated with re-hedging on large movements in the underlying stock's price, and research indicates portfolios tend to have lower cash flows if re-hedged too frequently.

Nomenclature
  The sensitivity of an option's value to a change in the underlying stock's price.

     The initial value of the option.

       The current value of the option.

     The initial value of the underlying stock.

       The current value of the underlying stock.

Mathematical interpretation

Delta measures the sensitivity of the value of an option to changes in the price of the underlying stock assuming all other variables remain unchanged.

Mathematically, delta is represented as partial derivative  
of the option's fair value with respect to the price of the underlying security.

Delta is clearly a function of S, however Delta is also a function of strike price and time to expiry.

Therefore, if a position is delta neutral (or, instantaneously delta-hedged) its instantaneous change in value, for an infinitesimal change in the value of the underlying security, will be zero; see Hedge (finance). Since delta measures the exposure of a derivative to changes in the value of the underlying, a portfolio that is delta neutral is effectively hedged. That is, its overall value will not change for small changes in the price of its underlying instrument.

Creating the position
Delta hedging - i.e. establishing the required hedge -  may be accomplished by buying or selling an amount of the underlier that corresponds to the delta of the portfolio.  By adjusting the amount bought or sold on new positions, the portfolio delta can be made to sum to zero, and the portfolio is then delta neutral. See Rational pricing delta hedging.

Options market makers, or others, may form a delta neutral portfolio using related options instead of the underlying. The portfolio's delta (assuming the same underlier) is then the sum of all the individual options' deltas.  This method can also be used when the underlier is difficult to trade, for instance when an underlying stock is hard to borrow and therefore cannot be sold short.

Theory
The existence of a delta neutral portfolio was shown as part of the original proof of the Black–Scholes model, the first comprehensive model to produce correct prices for some classes of options. See Black-Scholes: Derivation.

From the Taylor expansion of the value of an option, we get the change in the value of an option, for a change in the value of the underlier :

where (delta) and (gamma); see Greeks (finance).

For any small change in the underlier, we can ignore the second-order term and use the quantity  to determine how much of the underlier to buy or sell to create a hedged portfolio. However, when the change in the value of the underlier is not small, the second-order term, cannot be ignored: see Convexity (finance).

In practice, maintaining a delta neutral portfolio requires continuous recalculation of the position's Greeks and rebalancing of the underlier's position. Typically, this rebalancing is performed daily or weekly.

References

External links
Delta Hedging, investopedia.com
Theory & Application for Delta Hedging

Financial markets
Derivatives (finance)
Mathematical finance